There are a number of different lists compiled by various publications around the world that attempt to determine the number of billionaires by world's major cities. The best-known estimate is by Forbes.

Forbes

In 2022, Forbes listed New York City with the most billionaires at 107 people, followed by Beijing with 83 billionaires, and Hong Kong in third place with 68 billionaires.

See also
 Lists of billionaires
 List of cities by number of millionaires
 List of cities by number of ultra high-net-worth individuals
 List of cities by total wealth
 List of countries by number of billionaires
 List of countries by total wealth
 List of wealthiest families
 List of universities by number of billionaire alumni

References

Lists of people by wealth
Lists of cities